In enzymology, a diferric-transferrin reductase is an enzyme that catalyzes the chemical reaction

transferrin[Fe(II)]2 + NAD+ + H+  transferrin[Fe(III)]2 + NADH

The 3 substrates of this enzyme are [[transferrin[Fe(II)]2]], NAD+, and H+, whereas its two products are [[transferrin[Fe(III)]2]] and NADH.

This enzyme belongs to the family of oxidoreductases, specifically those oxidizing metal ion with NAD+ or NADP+ as acceptor.  The systematic name of this enzyme class is transferrin[Fe(II)]2:NAD+ oxidoreductase. Other names in common use include diferric transferrin reductase, NADH diferric transferrin reductase, and transferrin reductase.  This enzyme participates in porphyrin and chlorophyll metabolism.

Structural studies

As of late 2007, only one structure has been solved for this class of enzymes, with the PDB accession code .

References

 

EC 1.16.1
NADH-dependent enzymes
Enzymes of known structure
Transferrins